The Sea Dogs were English adventurers of the Elizabethan era.

Sea Dogs may also refer to:


Arts and entertainment
 Sea Dogs (film)
 Sea Dogs (video game)
 Sea Dogs of Australia, a 1913 Australian silent film
 "Seadogs", an episode of the television series NCIS

Sports
 Portland Sea Dogs, a baseball team
 Saint John Sea Dogs, a hockey team
 Seadog, a nickname of Scarborough Athletic F.C. & the former Scarborough F.C.

Other uses
 Sea Dog Island, an uninhabited island in the Falkland Islands

See also 
 Seadog (disambiguation)
 
 Sea-Doo, a Canadian brand of personal water craft